Dmitry Gerasimov also spelled as Dmitri Gerasimov (born 16 April 1988) is a Russian rugby union player who generally plays as a centre represents Russia internationally.

He was included in the Russian squad for the 2019 Rugby World Cup which is scheduled to be held in Japan for the first time and also marks Dmitry's first World Cup appearance despite making his international debut in 2008.

Career 
Dmitry made his international debut for Russia against Spain on 8 November 2008. He is currently playing for Enisey-STM club since 2007. In the European Rugby Challenge Cup he has 4 tries in 22 matches.

Honours
 Russian Championships (9): 2011, 2012, 2014, 2016, 2017, 2018, 2019, 2020-21, 2021-22
 Russian Cup (7): 2009, 2014, 2016, 2017, 2020, 2021, 2022
 Russian Supercup (3): 2014, 2015, 2017
 European Rugby Continental Shield (2): 2016-17, 2017-18

References 

Russian rugby union players
Russia international rugby union players
Living people
1988 births
Sportspeople from Krasnoyarsk
Rugby union centres
Yenisey-STM Krasnoyarsk players